Jean de Marigny (died December 26, 1350), French bishop, was a younger brother of Enguerrand de Marigny.

Biography
Entering the church at an early age, he was rapidly advanced until in 1313 he was made bishop of Beauvais. During the next twenty years he was one of the most notable of the members of the French episcopate, and was particularly in favour with King Philip VI.

He devoted himself in 1335 to the completion of the choir of Beauvais Cathedral, the enormous windows of which were filled with the richest glass. But this building activity, which has left one of the most notable Gothic monuments in Europe, was broken into by the Hundred Years' War.

Jean de Marigny, a successful administrator and man of affairs rather than a saintly churchman, was made one of the king's lieutenants in southern France in 1341 against the English invasion.

His most important military operation, however, was when in 1346 he successfully held out in Beauvais against a siege by the English, who had overrun the country up to the walls of the city. Created archbishop of Rouen in 1347 as a reward for this defence, he enjoyed his new honours only three years.

In fiction
Marigny is a major character in Les Rois maudits (The Accursed Kings), a series of historical novels by Maurice Druon, which were adapted into two French television miniseries in 1972 and 2005. He was portrayed by René Roussel in 1972 and by Michel Hermon in 2005.

References

Bishops of Beauvais
Archbishops of Rouen
14th-century Roman Catholic archbishops in France
1350 deaths
Year of birth unknown
14th-century peers of France